Naomi May Jensen Hoogesteger is a former British rower.

Education 
Hoogesteger studied Modern Languages at Durham University and completed an MA by Research in Spanish in 2006. While there she took up rowing at Durham University Boat Club.

Career 
In rowing, Hoogesteger was a member of the crew that won the Bronze medal in the Lightweight Women's Four at the 2005 World Rowing Championships.

In 2011 Hoogesteger, alongside David Hosking, formed part of a team that broke the world record for rowing across the Atlantic Ocean.

References

External links
 

1981 births
Living people
English female rowers
Durham University Boat Club rowers
Alumni of the College of St Hild and St Bede, Durham
World Rowing Championships medalists for Great Britain